Rosa Parks (1913–2005) was an American civil rights activist.

Rosa Parks may also refer to:

Education 
 The Rosa Parks Institute or Rosa and Raymond Parks Institute for Self Development, a youth organization in Detroit, Michigan
 Rosa L. Parks Scholarship Foundation, a foundation in Michigan
 Rosa Parks Middle School, a school in Montgomery County, Maryland
 Rosa L. Parks School of Fine and Performing Arts, a high school in Paterson, New Jersey
 Rosa Parks/Millbrook Elementary School (Lancaster, Texas) merci

Transportation 
 Rosa Parks station (Paris), France, a railway station  
 Rosa Parks Transit Station, a people-mover station in Jacksonville, Florida
 Rosa Parks Transit Center, a bus terminal in the Capitol Park Historic District of Detroit, Michigan
 Rosa Parks Hempstead Transit Center for the Nassau Inter-County Express system, New York
 Rosa Parks station (TriMet), a light rail station in Portland, Oregon
 Rosa Parks Freeway, a portion of Interstate 10 in California
 Rosa Parks Memorial Highway, the portion of Interstate 96 that cuts through the city of Detroit

Other uses 
 "Rosa Parks" (song), a 1998 hip hop song
 Rosa Parks (National Statuary Hall), a 2013 bronze sculpture
 Statue of Rosa Parks (Eugene, Oregon), a sculpture in Eugene, Oregon
 Rosa Parks Act, a 2006 act of the Alabama legislature
 Rosa Parks Circle, a plaza in downtown Grand Rapids, Michigan

See also
 "Rosa" (Doctor Who), an episode of Doctor Who
 Rosa Parks Highway (disambiguation)
 Rosa Parks v. LaFace Records, a 1999 lawsuit filed on behalf of Rosa Parks in reaction to the Outkast song "Rosa Parks"